Geraldine Brooks may refer to:

Geraldine Brooks (actress) (1925–1977), American stage, television and film performer
Geraldine Brooks (writer) (born 1955), Australian journalist and novelist

See also
Brooks (surname)